Diospyros euphlehia is a tree in the family Ebenaceae. Inflorescences bear up to 15 flowers. D. euphlehia is endemic to Borneo.

References

euphlehia
Plants described in 1929
Endemic flora of Borneo
Trees of Borneo